Yosemite Creek is a  creek of the Sierra Nevada, located in Yosemite National Park, Mariposa County, California, United States.

Geography
The creek's headwaters are at the Grant Lakes, and it flows southwest to drop  over Yosemite Falls to Yosemite Valley, then flows southeast to its mouth at the Merced River,  just southwest of Yosemite Village.   The Merced is a tributary of the San Joaquin River, in the San Joaquin Valley.

Today, Yosemite Creek flows over the Yosemite Valley rim to create Upper Yosemite Fall. Before its diversion about 130,000 years ago, Yosemite Creek flowed down an older channel just to the west, from which it cascaded down through the steep ravine that is now the route of the Yosemite Falls Trail.

Hydrology

The Yosemite Creek watershed, which feeds the creek and Yosemite Falls, contains . It is largely a granite basin that was scraped clean of soil by glaciers. Because of the shallow soil base, the Yosemite Creek watershed has little capacity to hold water, so it quickly drains as the snow melts.

See also

Yosemite Falls
Geology of the Yosemite area
Yosemite Valley

References

Merced River
Rivers of the Sierra Nevada (United States)
Rivers of Yosemite National Park
Rivers of Mariposa County, California
Tributaries of the San Joaquin River
Rivers of Northern California
Rivers of the Sierra Nevada in California